Dennis Henry Grady (December 7, 1886 – July 10, 1974) was an American football, basketball, and baseball coach. He served as the head football coach at Alma College from 1910 to 1911 and at Northwestern University in 1913, compiling a career college football record of 8–12. Grady's football coaching record at Northwestern was 1–6.  Grady was also the fifth head basketball coach for Northwestern, coaching two seasons from 1912 to 1914 and tallying a mark of 25–10.

Head coaching record

Football

References

1886 births
1974 deaths
Alma Scots football coaches
Alma Scots men's basketball coaches
Northwestern Wildcats baseball coaches
Northwestern Wildcats football coaches
Northwestern Wildcats men's basketball coaches